Silver & Gold: Songs for Christmas, Vols. 6–10 is a five-EP box set of Christmas-related songs and carols recorded by Sufjan Stevens between 2006 and 2012. It is a follow-up to Songs for Christmas, which was released six years prior.
On October 2, 2012,  it was announced that Stevens would release Silver & Gold on November 13, 2012 in digital format, CD and LP boxset. On October 24, 2012, a claymation music video, animated by Lee Hardcastle, was released for "Mr. Frosty Man".

Reception
The album has received mostly positive reviews from critics, with Pitchfork giving it a 7.8 out of 10. As Keelan H. of Sputnikmusic writes,"[T]he album exists on [a] plane where introspection meets with group sing-a-longs, depression meets with joyous outbursts, traditional meets with left-field kookiness." At Metacritic, which assigns a normalized rating out of 100 to reviews from mainstream critics, the album has received an average score of 76, based on 13 reviews, indicating "generally favorable reviews".

Track listing
Gloria: Songs for Christmas, Vol. VI
Recorded December 2006
"Silent Night" - 2:26 (words by Joseph Mohr; melody by Franz Xaver Gruber; English translation by John Freeman Young)
"Lumberjack Christmas / No One Can Save You from Christmases Past" - 3:22 (music by Aaron Dessner, Bryce Dessner, and Sufjan Stevens; words by Sufjan Stevens)
"Coventry Carol" - 2:54 (featuring Marla Hansen) (16th-century English Carol)
"The Midnight Clear" - 2:49 (music by Aaron Dessner, Bryce Dessner, and Sufjan Stevens; words by Sufjan Stevens)
"Carol of St. Benjamin the Bearded One" - 3:32 (music by Aaron Dessner, Bryce Dessner, and Sufjan Stevens; words by Sufjan Stevens)
"Go Nightly Cares" - 1:44 (music by John Dowland)
"Barcarola (You Must Be a Christmas Tree)" - 7:03 (music by Aaron Dessner, Bryce Dessner, and Sufjan Stevens; words by Sufjan Stevens)
"Auld Lang Syne" - 1:35 (words by Robert Burns; music: traditional Scots folk melody)

I Am Santa's Helper: Songs for Christmas, Vol. VII
Recorded December 2007
"Christ the Lord Is Born" - 0:49 (music by Leoš Janáček)
"Christmas Woman" - 5:33 (words & music by Sufjan Stevens)
"Break Forth O Beauteous Heavenly Light" - 1:09 (music by Johann Schop; harmony by J.S. Bach)
"Happy Family Christmas" - 1:23 (words & music by Sufjan Stevens)
"Jingle Bells" - 1:19 (words & music by James Lord Pierpont)
"Mysteries of the Christmas Mist" - 2:10 (music by Sufjan Stevens)
"Lift Up Your Heads Ye Mighty Gates" - 1:20 (words by Georg Weissel; translated by Catherine Winkworth; music by Thomas Williams)
"We Wish You a Merry Christmas" - 1:16 (16th-century English Carol)
"Ah Holy Jesus" - 2:42 (words by Johann Heermann: music by Johann Crüger)
"Behold! The Birth of Man, the Face of Glory" - 1:09 (music by Sufjan Stevens)
"Ding-a-ling-a-ring-a-ling" - 1:50 (words & music by Sufjan Stevens)
"How Shall I Fitly Meet Thee?" - 2:09 (music by J.S. Bach; adapted by J. Troutbeck)
"Mr. Frosty Man" - 1:50 (words & music by Sufjan Stevens)
"Make Haste to See the Baby" - 1:23 (music by Sufjan Stevens)
"Ah Holy Jesus" - 1:29 (with reed organ)
"Hark! The Herald Angels Sing" - 1:51 (words by Charles Wesley; music by Felix Mendelssohn)
"Morning" - 2:28 (Sacred Harp) (music by Amos Pilsbury)
"Idumea" - 3:50 (Sacred Harp) (words by Charles Wesley; music by Ananias Davisson)
"Eternal Happiness or Woe" - 1:23 (music by Sufjan Stevens)
"Ah Holy Jesus" - 1:00 (a capella)
"I Am Santa's Helper" - 1:52 (words & music by Sufjan Stevens)
"'Ma'oz Tzur' (Rock of Ages)" - 0:42 (traditional Jewish hymn)
"Even the Earth Will Perish and the Universe Give Way" - 2:01 (music by Sufjan Stevens)

Christmas Infinity Voyage: Songs for Christmas, Vol. VIII
Originally recorded December 2008, as "Astral Inter Planet Space Captain Christmas Infinity Voyage: Songs for Christmas Vol. 8"; box set version re-recorded 2011-2012
"Angels We Have Heard on High" - 4:04 (music & words by Sufjan Stevens [based on the original hymn])
"Do You Hear What I Hear?" - 9:14 (words by Noël Regney; music by Gloria Shayne)
"Christmas in the Room" - 4:23 (words & music by Sufjan Stevens)
"It Came Upon the Midnight Clear" - 0:48 (words by Edmund Sears; music by Richard Storrs Willis)
"Good King Wenceslas" - 4:18 (words by John Mason Neale; music: 13th Century carol)
"Alphabet St." - 1:36 (words & music by Prince)
"Particle Physics" - 1:04 (music by Sufjan Stevens)
"Joy to the World" - 5:25 (words by Isaac Watts; music by Lowell Mason)
"The Child with the Star on His Head" - 15:30 (words & music by Sufjan Stevens)

Let It Snow: Songs for Christmas, Vol. IX
Recorded December 2009
"I'll Be Home for Christmas" - 3:22 (words & music by Walter Kent, Kim Gannon, Buck Ram)
"Santa Claus Is Coming to Town" - 2:41 (words & music by J. Fred Coots and Haven Gillespie)
"The Sleigh in the Moon" - 1:44 (featuring Cat Martino) (words & music by Cat Martino)
"Sleigh Ride" - 2:28 (words & music by Leroy Anderson and Mitchell Parish)
"Ave Maria" - 2:09 (featuring Cat Martino) (words by God Himself; music by Franz Schubert)
"X-mas Spirit Catcher" - 3:31 (words & music by Sufjan Stevens)
"Let It Snow! Let It Snow! Let It Snow!" - 2:17 (words & music by Jule Styne and Sammy Cahn)
"A Holly Jolly Christmas" - 2:27 (words & music by Johnny Marks)
"Christmas Face" - 0:40 (featuring Sebastian Krueger) (words & music by Sebastian Krueger)

Christmas Unicorn: Songs for Christmas, Vol. X
Recorded December 2010
"Have Yourself a Merry Little Christmas" - 3:42 (words & music by Hugh Martin and Ralph Blane)
"It Came Upon a Midnight Clear" - 0:40 (words by Edmund Sears; music by Richard Storrs Willis)
"Up on the Housetop" - 4:21 (featuring Vesper Stamper) (words & music by Benjamin Hanby; arr. by Sufjan Stevens)
"Angels We Have Heard on High" - 0:52 (traditional French carol)
"We Need a Little Christmas" - 2:03 (words & music by Jerry Herman)
"Happy Karma Christmas" - 3:36 (words & music by Sufjan Stevens)
"We Three Kings" - 0:52 (music by John Henry Hopkins Jr.)
"Justice Delivers Its Death" - 3:16 (var. & arrangement by Sufjan Stevens; based on the song "Silver & Gold" by J. Marks)
"Christmas Unicorn" - 12:28 (words & music by Sufjan Stevens; "Love Will Tear Us Apart" used by permission, written by Ian Curtis, Peter Hook, Stephen Morris, and Bernard Sumner)

Charts

Weekly charts

Year-end charts

References

External links
Silver & Gold at Bandcamp

2012 compilation albums
2012 Christmas albums
Sufjan Stevens compilation albums
Christmas compilation albums
Albums produced by Sufjan Stevens
Asthmatic Kitty compilation albums
Christmas albums by American artists
Covers albums
Folk Christmas albums